Finger Lake is a lake in Wasilla, Alaska. It is not technically a finger lake, but was named so by Captain Edward Glenn, who led an army expedition to Alaska in 1898 and felt that  "when viewing the lake on a map, a point of land in the lake gives the impression of a finger." The lake has populations of Rainbow Trout, Arctic Char and Arctic Grayling and is a popular fishing spot, including ice fishing in winter. The lake is at the south end of the Seven-mile canoe trail that ends at Wasilla Lake, the only portage is at the north end of Finger Lake.

Park

Alaska State Parks operates the Finger Lake State Recreation Area, a  park with a  campground, boat launch, and picnic areas. The park also contains the regional headquarters for Matanuska-Susitna Valley area parks.

References

Lakes of Alaska
State parks of Alaska